Fred Åkerström besjunger Frida (English: Fred Åkerström re-sings Frida) is an album by the Swedish folk singer-songwriter and guitar player Fred Åkerström. On this album, Åkerström interprets songs of the Swedish folk author, Birger Sjöberg

Track listing
 Söndagsmorgon
 Frida sörjer sommaren
 Basens sorg
 Bleka dödens minut
 Aftontankar vid Fridas ruta
 Duvdrottningen
 Romantisk promenad
 Hos min doktor
 Månens hy
 Finge Frida rätt
 Krigssyn

External links
 Lyrics

1964 albums
Swedish-language albums
Fred Åkerström albums